"Roll On Down The Highway" is a song written by Fred Turner and Robbie Bachman, first recorded by Canadian rock group Bachman–Turner Overdrive (BTO) for their 1974 album Not Fragile. The lead vocal is provided by Turner.

Turner and Randy Bachman had originally been contracted by Ford to write a song for the automotive company's commercials, but Ford never picked up any of their compositions. Robbie Bachman later helped develop one of Turner's ideas into a Top 20 hit. "Roll on Down the Highway" peaked at No. 14 on the US Billboard Hot 100 on March 1, 1975. It reached No. 8 on the Cash Box Top 100 singles, and No. 4 on the Canadian RPM chart, and gave the band their second — and final — hit in the United Kingdom, reaching No. 22 in the UK Singles Chart.

The song was the second of two singles issued from the Not Fragile LP, and was the follow-up to the group's greatest hit, "You Ain't Seen Nothing Yet".

Billboard described "Roll On down the Highway" as a "driving rocker combining simplicity of sound with vocal and instrumental skill."  Cash Box called it a "great car radio tune," saying "gruff and gritty, they strike the primal chord and growl out the lyrics with gusto." Record World called it "interstate, international, intergalactic rollin' rock!"

Chart performance

Weekly charts

Year-end charts

Cover versions
The California-based girl group The Donnas covered "Roll On Down the Highway" in 2005. It was never included on any of their albums, but instead appeared on the soundtrack of the Lindsay Lohan movie spectacular, Herbie: Fully Loaded.

References

External links
 

1974 songs
1975 singles
Bachman–Turner Overdrive songs
Mercury Records singles
Songs written by Fred Turner (musician)